The Holland Building, also known as the  Mrs. Clifford L. Jarrett Building, is a historic commercial building located in Springfield, Missouri, United States. Built in 1914, it is a five-story, rectangular commercial building sheathed in marble, blond brick, and cream-colored glazed terra cotta. It features a heavy bracketed cornice of glazed terra cotta. It was listed on the National Register of Historic Places in 2002.

References

Commercial buildings on the National Register of Historic Places in Missouri
Commercial buildings completed in 1914
Buildings and structures in Springfield, Missouri
National Register of Historic Places in Greene County, Missouri